The Horton Road Hospital was a mental health facility in Horton Road, Gloucester, England.

History
The hospital, which was designed by William Stark (who died before the hospital was fully designed), John Wheeler (who also died before the hospital was fully designed) and John Collingwood using a radial plan layout, opened as the First Gloucestershire County Asylum in July 1823. The west wing was extended in 1846.

The facility joined the National Health Service as the Horton Road Hospital in 1948. In the early 1970s the Horton Road Hospital released land on the west of its site to facilitate the construction of the Gloucestershire Royal Hospital. After the introduction of Care in the Community in the early 1980s, the hospital went into a period of decline and closed in March 1988. The main building was converted to apartments in 2005.

References

Hospital buildings completed in 1823
Hospitals established in 1823
1823 establishments in England
1988 disestablishments in England
Hospitals disestablished in 1988
Defunct hospitals in England
Former psychiatric hospitals in England
Hospitals in Gloucestershire